The Prince Hall Masonic Temple built in 1922 is an historic Prince Hall Masonic building located at 1000 U Street, NW in Washington, D.C.  It is the headquarters of the Prince Hall Grand Lodge District of Columbia, and houses the MWPGM Roland D. Williams Center for Masonic Excellence.  It is part of the Greater U Street Historic District.

History
It was designed by Albert Cassell, and constructed from 1922 to 1929.

It was listed on the National Register of Historic Places in 1983.

References

External links

Masonic buildings in Washington, D.C.
Masonic buildings completed in 1922
Clubhouses on the National Register of Historic Places in Washington, D.C.
Prince Hall Masonic buildings in the United States
Individually listed contributing properties to historic districts on the National Register in Washington, D.C.